Park Byeong-gi (also known as Park Byeong-ki or Park Byung-ki, born 22 February 1963) is a South Korean former sailor. He competed in the Tornado event at the 1988 Summer Olympics.

References

External links
 
 

1963 births
Living people
South Korean male sailors (sport)
Olympic sailors of South Korea
Sailors at the 1988 Summer Olympics – Tornado
Place of birth missing (living people)